JNJ-61393215 is an orexin antagonist medication which is under development for the treatment of depression and anxiety disorders. It is an orally active compound and acts as a selective antagonist of the orexin OX1 receptor (1-SORA). Preliminary clinical findings suggest that JNJ-61393215 may have anti-panic effects in humans. As of November 2021, JNJ-61393215 is in phase 2 clinical trials for the treatment of major depressive disorder and is in the preclinical stage of development for treatment of panic disorder, while no further development has been reported for treatment of other anxiety disorders. The drug was originated and developed by Janssen Pharmaceuticals.

See also
 List of investigational antidepressants § Orexin receptor antagonists
 List of investigational anxiolytics

References

Deuterated compounds
Experimental drugs
Fluoroarenes
Ketones
Orexin antagonists
Pyridines
Pyrimidines
Trifluoromethyl compounds
Heterocyclic compounds with 2 rings